Parian or Parián may refer to:

Pertaining to Paros, the Greek island: 
 Parian marble, a stone quarried on Paros used for sculpture
 Parian ware, a ceramic substitute for marble which was fashionable in Victorian England
 Parian doll, a type of doll manufactured primarily in Germany, from around 1860 to 1880
 Parian Chronicle, a chronology carved into a stela of Parian marble

Based on Parián, a Spanish word of Tagalog origin that was subsequently imported from the Philippines into New Spain: 
 Parián (Manila), a commercial neighborhood in Manila
 Parian, Calamba, a neighborhood in Calamba, Philippines
 El Parián (Puebla), a market in Puebla City, Puebla
 El Parián (Tlaquepaque), a market in Tlaquepaque, Jalisco
 Centro Comercial El Parián, a shopping center in Aguascalientes City, Aguascalientes

Iranian place names: 
 Parian, Bushehr, a village in Bushehr Province, Iran
 Parian, Kermanshah, a village in Kermanshah Province, Iran

See also
 Pariancillo Villa in Valenzuela, Metro Manila, whose name is derived from Parián
 Pariana and Parianella, plants
 Pariangan in Indonesia